Negro World was the newspaper of the Marcus Garvey's Universal Negro Improvement Association and African Communities League (UNIA). Founded by Garvey and Amy Ashwood Garvey, the newspaper was published weekly in Harlem, New York, and distributed internationally to the UNIA's chapters in more than forty countries. Distributed weekly, at its peak, the Negro World reached a circulation of 200,000.

Notable editors included Marcus Garvey, T. Thomas Fortune, William H. Ferris, W.A. Domingo and Amy Jacques Garvey.

Background
Garvey founded the UNIA in July 1914, and within the organization's first few years had started publishing Negro World.

Monthly, Negro World distributed more copies than The Messenger, The Crisis and Opportunity (other important African-American publications). Colonial rulers banned its sales and even possession in their territories, including both British Empire and French colonial empire possessions. Distribution in foreign countries was conducted through black seamen who would smuggle the paper into such areas.

Negro World ceased publication in 1933.

Content
For a nickel, readers received a front-page editorial by Garvey, along with poetry and articles of international interest to people of African ancestry. Under the editorship of Amy Jacques Garvey the paper featured a full page called "Our Women and What They Think".

Negro World also played an important part in the Harlem Renaissance  of the 1920s. The paper was a focal point for publication on the arts and African-American culture, including poetry, commentary on theatre and music, and regular book reviews. Romeo Lionel Dougherty, a prominent figure of the Jazz Age, began writing for Negro World in 1922.

Contributors
Notable editors and contributors to Negro World included:

 Duse Mohamed Ali
 John Edward Bruce
 Wilfred Adolphus Domingo
 William Henry Ferris
 Timothy Thomas Fortune
 Amy Ashwood Garvey
 Amy Jacques Garvey
 Hubert Henry Harrison
 Samuel Alfred Haynes
 Zora Neale Hurston
 John G. Jackson
 Robert Lincoln Poston
 Andy Razaf
 Joel Augustus Rogers
 Arthur Schomburg
 William Alexander Stephenson
 Eric Walrond
 Carter Godwin Woodson

References 

1918 establishments in New York (state)
1933 disestablishments in New York (state)
Defunct weekly newspapers
Defunct African-American newspapers
African-American history between emancipation and the civil rights movement
Defunct newspapers published in New York City
Publications established in 1918
Publications disestablished in 1933
Universal Negro Improvement Association and African Communities League
African-American newspapers published in New York (state)